Boyd's Packing House was the first packing house in Omaha, Nebraska. Founded by Irish-born James Boyd in 1872, the plant processed pork initially. The plant was destroyed by fire January 18, 1880, and was rebuilt much larger. Boyd sold his plant in 1887.

See also 
 History of Omaha, Nebraska
 Economy of Omaha, Nebraska

References

External links 
 "Historic photo of Hammond Packing Plant"

Former buildings and structures in Omaha, Nebraska
History of South Omaha, Nebraska
1872 establishments in Nebraska
Irish-American culture in Omaha, Nebraska
Meatpacking industry in Omaha, Nebraska